Defays is a Walloon family name of Latin origin. Notable people with the surname include:

 Frank Defays (born 1974), Belgian football player and manager
 Jean-Marc Defays, Belgian linguist
 Lucien Defays (1863–1949), Belgian politician
 Pierre Richard (real name Pierre-Richard Maurice Charles Léopold Defays, born 1934), French actor and film director

French-language surnames